The 2003 CCHA Men's Ice Hockey Tournament was the 32nd CCHA Men's Ice Hockey Tournament in conference history. It was played between March 14 and March 22, 2003. First round games were played at campus sites, while all 'super six' games were played at Joe Louis Arena in Detroit, Michigan. By winning the tournament, Michigan won the Mason Cup and received the Central Collegiate Hockey Association's automatic bid to the 2003 NCAA Division I Men's Ice Hockey Tournament.

Format
The tournament featured four rounds of play. In the First Round, the first and twelfth seeds, the second and eleventh seeds, the third and tenth seeds, the fourth and ninth seeds, the fifth and eighth seeds and the sixth and seventh seeds played a best-of-three series. All six victors in the first round advance as the newly minted 'Super Six' and play only single-elimination for the duration of the tournament. The top two ranked winners receive byes into the semifinals while the four other teams play in the quarterfinals to determine the other qualifiers. In the semifinals, the remaining highest and lowest seeds and second highest and second lowest seeds play a single-game, with the winners advancing to the finals. The tournament champion receives an automatic bid to the 2003 NCAA Men's Division I Ice Hockey Tournament.

Conference standings
Note: GP = Games played; W = Wins; L = Losses; T = Ties; PTS = Points; GF = Goals For; GA = Goals Against

Bracket
Teams are reseeded after the first round and quarterfinals

Note: * denotes overtime period(s)

First round

(1) Ferris State vs. (12) Lake Superior State

(2) Michigan vs. (11) Bowling Green

(3) Ohio State vs. (10) Nebraska-Omaha

(4) Michigan State vs. (9) Alaska-Fairbanks

(5) Northern Michigan vs. (8) Western Michigan

(6) Miami vs. (7) Notre Dame

Quarterfinals

(3) Ohio State vs. (7) Notre Dame

(4) Michigan State vs. (5) Northern Michigan

Semifinals

(1) Ferris State vs. (5) Northern Michigan

(2) Michigan vs. (3) Ohio State

Third Place

(3) Ohio State vs. (5) Northern Michigan

Championship

(1) Ferris State vs. (2) Michigan

Tournament awards

All-Tournament Team
F Jed Ortmeyer (Michigan)
F Chris Kunitz (Ferris State)
F Dwight Helminen* (Michigan)
D Simon Mangos (Ferris State)
D Brandon Rogers (Michigan)
G Al Montoya (Michigan)
* Most Valuable Player(s)

Tournament Three Stars
3 Craig Kowalski (Northern Michigan)
2 Chris Kunitz (Ferris State)
1 Dwight Helminen (Michigan)

References

External links

CCHA Men's Ice Hockey Tournament
Ccha tournament